Walt McKee (born June 28, 1949) is a former award winning and Grey Cup champion kicker who played in the Canadian Football League from 1972 to 1975.

A graduate of University of Manitoba and member of the Bison's 1969 and 70 championship teams, McKee joined the Winnipeg Blue Bombers in 1972 and, with 108 punts for a 41.5 yard average, was winner of the Dr. Beattie Martin Trophy for Canadian rookie of the year in the west. He was second in the league in punting average the next 2 seasons (with 44.2 and 41.8 yards.) He also was a place kicker, handling kickoffs but making only 27 of his 69 field goal attempts. He finished his career with the Edmonton Eskimos, playing 6 games and punting 36 times for a 41.8 yard average in 1975, the year they won the Grey Cup.

References

1949 births
Living people
Canadian Football League Rookie of the Year Award winners
Canadian football placekickers
Canadian football punters
Canadian players of Canadian football
Edmonton Elks players
Manitoba Bisons football players
Winnipeg Blue Bombers players